Georgie Tunny (born 1991) is an Australian journalist and television presenter.

Tunny is best known for her work as a presenter Network 10's The Project and formerly the ABC series News Breakfast.

Biography

Early life and education
Tunny was born and raised in Brisbane, Queensland. She attended the University of Queensland, graduating with a double Bachelor degree in Arts and Journalism in 2013. She began her career with an internship at The Courier-Mail

ABC News Breakfast
In 2012, she joined the ABC becoming a sports presenter on News Breakfast in 2015.

In 2017, Tunny attempted to interview Melbourne Victory football player Mitch Austin. However, after Tunny asking her first question, Austin suffered an apparent panic attack and walked off the set. The incident attracted considerable media attention. Asked about the incident in 2022 during the I've Got News For You podcast, Tunny described the moment as "terrifying" and said that although she was concerned for Austin's welfare, she regrets being initially concerned for herself and the possible ramifications the interview would have on her career.

In August 2021, The Age published a letter from a female reader complimenting Tunny for being "a lovely natural young woman" and not "a bottle blonde with eyelash extensions or rounded cleavage", calling Tunny "a breath of fresh air, with plenty of sunshine". This prompted former News Breakfast presenter Virginia Trioli to criticise the newspaper for publishing such a letter. Editor of The Age Gay Alcorn subsequently apologised to readers and to Tunny describing it as "an inappropriate letter that should not have been published."

Career at Foxtel
In late October 2021, it was announced Tunny would be leaving the ABC after eight years to be the host of daily News Flash segments on Foxtel's news streaming service Flash, which had been launched earlier that month.

The Project
After Carrie Bickmore announced she would be taking extended leave from The Project in March 2022, Tunny and Chrissie Swan were announced as Bickmore's replacements.

In August 2022, it was announced Tunny had left the Flash streaming platform after she was appointed as a permanent member of The Project, as a producer, reporter and presenter.

Apart from her role with The Project, Tunny was also a member of Network 10's Melbourne Cup Carnival horse racing coverage in 2021 and 2022.

Personal life
Tunny commenced a relationship with Australian singer and actor Rob Mills after he contacted her in 2018 after seeing her on News Breakfast. Mills announced on 31 December 2021 that he and Tunny were engaged.

References 

ABC News (Australia) presenters
Australian women television presenters
1991 births
Living people